Ident or IDENT may refer to:

Station identification, in broadcasting
Ident protocol, an Internet protocol that helps identify the user of a particular TCP connection
Ident (aviation), an identification function in aviation transponders

See also
Identity (disambiguation)
Identification (disambiguation)
Identifier